Joyce Adeline Bamford-Addo,  (born 26 March 1937) is a Ghanaian barrister and judge who served as the Speaker of the Parliament of Ghana from 2009 to 2013. The Speaker's position is the third most important in Ghana. She was previously a Justice of the Supreme Court of Ghana. Following her appointment to the Supreme Court bench, she became the first woman to become a Justice of the Supreme Court of Ghana. She served in that role from 1991 till 2004 when she retired. She was also the first woman to be elected Speaker in such a position in the West African sub-region. Her active campaign for women's empowerment was demonstrated in many conferences, meetings and workshops both locally and internationally.

Early life and education 
Born in 1937 to an English father and a Ghanaian mother from Aburi, Joyce Bamford-Addo attended St. Mary's Boarding School and Our Lady of Apostles (OLA) Boarding School, along with her sister Cynthia, in Cape Coast for her basic education. She subsequently attended Holy Child School, also in Cape Coast for her secondary education. She proceeded to the United Kingdom for legal training. She joined the Inner Temple to train under the apprenticeship system known as Inns of court and was called to the English Bar in 1961.

Judicial service 
Bamford-Addo returned to Ghana after working in the United Kingdom for a year. She was called to the Ghana Bar in 1962. She started working as an Assistant State Attorney in 1963 and promoted to State Attorney, then subsequently promoted to become a Senior State Attorney before becoming a Principal State Attorney. She rose to become Chief State Attorney in 1973. She was appointed Director of Public Prosecutions in 1976, a position she held for 10 years.

Justice of the Supreme Court of Ghana 
She was also appointed by Jerry Rawlings as a Supreme Court Judge in 1991, becoming the first female Justice of the Supreme Court of Ghana. After working in the public service for several years, she retired voluntarily from the Supreme Court in October 2004. It was allegedly reported that she retired because when she was bypassed for her junior, Justice George Kingsley Acquah, in the appointment of Chief Justice.

Politics 
In 1991, during the late Provisional National Defence Council (PNDC) era, Bamford-Addo became the Second Deputy Speaker of Ghana's Consultative Assembly, set up to draft what became the 1992 constitution.

Speaker of Parliament 
Following the 2008 presidential and parliamentary elections, she was elected unopposed as the Speaker of the Fourth Parliament of the Fourth Republic of Ghana taking over from Ebenezer Sekyi-Hughes, serving as the first female to take up that position, and second female to head an arm of government after Georgina Theodora Wood was appointed Chief Justice of the Supreme Court of Ghana. The election also made her the highest ranked female in Ghana's political history surpassing Georgina Theodora Woods. She became known across in Africa and across the globe joining other female speakers like Betty Boothroyd in the United Kingdom and Nancy Pelosi of the United States of America as first female speakers of their respective countries.

Professional association 
Bamford-Addo is a member of the Ghana Bar Association, Catholic Lawyers Guild, International Federation of Women Lawyers (FIDA) and the Commonwealth Lawyers Association. Whilst working in the public service as a Supreme Court Judge, she also served as a member of the Legal Aid Board and the Judicial Council (General Legal Council).

She served as the representative from Ghana at the several UN Commission on the Status of women international conferences.

Awards and recognition 
Bamford-Addo was awarded the best woman of the year by the American Biographical Institute in 2000 due to her zeal and unfettered efforts towards women issues and women empowerment. She is considered as a female pacesetter in law and legislation in Ghana and an inspiration and role model generally to Ghanaian women.

She was honoured by Ghana Association of Women Entrepreneurs (GAWE) at their Global Women Entrepreneur Trade Fair and Investment Forum in Accra dinner and awards night in 2011 along with other Ghana's first women top office holders Justice Georgina Theodora Wood, first woman Chief Justice, Anna Bossman, first woman Acting Commissioner for the Commission on Human Rights and Administrative Justice (CHRAJ) and Elizabeth Mills-Robertson, first woman Acting Inspector General of Police (IGP).

In October 2011, she was honored by President John Evans Atta Mills with the Companion of the Order of the Volta, highest in the Order of Volta awards, in recognition of her outstanding service to Ghana.

Personal life 
Bamford-Addo is a devout Christian and worships as a Roman Catholic.

See also
Speaker of the Parliament of Ghana
List of judges of the Supreme Court of Ghana
Supreme Court of Ghana

References

External links 
 Profile on Parliament of Ghana website

1937 births
Living people
Ga-Adangbe people
Ghanaian Roman Catholics
Justices of the Supreme Court of Ghana
Speakers of the Parliament of Ghana
Members of the Inner Temple
Ghanaian women judges
People from Accra
Women members of the Parliament of Ghana
Women legislative speakers
Alumni of Holy Child High School, Ghana
20th-century Ghanaian lawyers
Ghanaian people of English descent